Adora is a feminine given name.

People 

 Adora Andrews (1872–1956), American actress
 Adora Cheung, American software developer
 Adora Dei, keyboardist in the house band for The Eric Andre Show
 Adora Oleh, British-born Nigerian television presenter
 Adora Svitak (b. 1997), American writer

Fictional characters 

 Adora (1980), a novel by Bertrice Small
 Adora Belle Dearheart, a character in Terry Pratchett's Discworld series (1983-2015)
 Adora Crellin, a character in Gillian Flynn's book Sharp Objects (2006)
 Princess Adora, real name of She-Ra, the title character from the 1985 series She-Ra: Princess of Power and its 2018 reboot She-Ra and the Princesses of Power

Given names
Feminine given names
English feminine given names